Wanda Piątkowska (born 23 June 1960) is a Polish rower. She competed in the women's eight event at the 1980 Summer Olympics.

References

1960 births
Living people
Polish female rowers
Olympic rowers of Poland
Rowers at the 1980 Summer Olympics
People from Grudziądz